Marie Bartête (25 February 1863 – 13 March 1938) was a French prisoner. She was sentenced on 4 June 1888 for shoplifting, and was the last women to die in prison in the penal colony of French Guiana.

Biography
Bartête was born on 25 February 1863 in Monein, France. She was abandoned by her mother, and became an orphan at the age of 9. She married at the age of 15, and became a widow at the age of 20. She was arrested and imprisoned for shoplifting several times. In 1888, Bartête was accused of "detestable conduct and morals". On 4 June, she was sentenced to the Prison of St-Laurent-du-Maroni in French Guiana.

Bartête received the right to marry a former convict of the penal colony, because the authorities wanted to populate the colony. In 1923, the investigative journalist Albert Londres visited Bartête in prison, and wrote down her story in Au Bagne (1923). During her stay in the prison, she contracted Elephantiasis tropica, and became disfigured. Bartête died on 13 March 1938 as the last women to die in the penal colony. In 2014, a monument was erected in Monein near her place of birth.

References

Bibliography
 
 
 

1863 births
1938 deaths
French female criminals
French prisoners and detainees
People from Béarn
Prisoners who died in French detention